Area code 270 is a telephone area code in the North American Numbering Plan (NANP) for the Commonwealth of Kentucky's western and south central counties. Area code 270 was split from area code 502 on April 19, 1999. Planning for the introduction of a second area code for the region, area code 364, was assigned in 2007. After several years of delay in activation, it was announced in December 2012 that the two area codes would be configured in an overlay plan in August 2013. Mandatory ten-digit dialing began on February 1, 2014. Numbers of the new area code were made available for assignment on March 3, 2014.

Major cities in the numbering plan area include Hopkinsville, Paducah, Henderson, Murray,  Bowling Green, Owensboro, Elizabethtown, and Madisonville. It also includes Kentucky's share of Fort Campbell. It does not include Green River Island, a former island of the Ohio River that is part of Kentucky despite being north of the river's present course. The most notable landmark in that area, served by Indiana's codes 812 and 930, is the Ellis Park horse racing track.

History
Area code 270 split off from area code 502 in 1999. The split generally followed the boundary between the Eastern and Central time zones; generally, Kentucky's share of the Central Time Zone became 270.

The creation of 270 was intended as a long-term solution.  However, within only six years, 270 was already close to exhaustion due to the proliferation of cell phones and pagers.  In 2006, Kentucky officials announced that 270 would run out of numbers in late 2007. On May 31, 2007, the Kentucky Public Service Commission (PSC) announced that 270 would be split along the Pennyrile Parkway, with a newly created area code serving western Kentucky (Paducah, Hopkinsville, Henderson, Madisonville,  Murray, and the Kentucky side of Fort Campbell), with west-central Kentucky (Bowling Green, Owensboro and Elizabethtown) retaining 270.  

The PSC noted that mandatory number pooling, recently imposed on the region, may delay the implementation of the new code--and thus spare customers in the territory slated to move to 364 the expense and burden of having to change their numbers for the second time in a decade. Surprisingly, Kentucky's two most urbanized area codes, 502 (Louisville) and 859 (serving Lexington and Northern Kentucky), were not expected to exhaust until 2017 at the earliest, even though they have fewer numbers than 270.

On June 13, 2007, the PSC announced that the new area code will be 364, but also announced that the previously announced implementation would be delayed in favor of number conservation measures including expanded number pooling. On June 15, 2007, the PSC postponed the permissive dialing of the new 364 area code to October 1, 2008. Mandatory dialing to the new area code was changed as well, but the actual date was to be determined later by the PSC. On November 1, 2007, the PSC again postponed permissive dialing of the new 364 area code, this time to January 1, 2009. On March 31, 2008, the PSC again postponed permissive dialing of the new 364 area code, to April 1, 2010. A date for mandatory dialing to 364 was left undetermined.

On June 2, 2009, the PSC again postponed permissive dialing of the new 364 area code, to January 1, 2012. Mandatory dialing to 364 was still left undetermined. The split was suspended indefinitely on August 13, 2010 with no permissive dialing date. In December 2010, relief was suspended completely and was believed to be dead. These subsequent delays of the implementation of the 270 / 364 area code split were due to further use of number conservation measures, including mandatory and expanded number pooling, as well as a weakened economy and a reduced usage of telephone numbers dedicated for use by computer and fax modems.

On September 27, 2012, the PSC announced that all number conservation options had been exhausted, and the implementation of 364 could no longer be delayed.  According to the PSC, NANPA projected the 270 region would exhaust by the first quarter of 2014.  NANPA recommended that instead of the original proposal for a split, 364 should be implemented as an overlay for the 270 region.  Under the NANPA proposal, existing 270 numbers would be retained by customers, but 10-digit dialing for local calls would be required across western Kentucky.

The PSC also considered an alternate proposal to split the 270 area code region. "Splitting the area code in two avoids ten digit dialing but requires changing all current area code 270 numbers within the new area code to 364.  That includes numbers assigned to wireless devices," said Andrew Melnykovych, Director of Communications for the PSC. The commission announced plans to hold public meetings throughout the 270 region the next month to explain the options and receive public comment. The commission also said that it will accept comments on the industry's overlay proposal for the 270 region up through November 16 2012.

References

External links

 List of exchanges from AreaCodeDownload.com, 270 Area Code

270
270
Telecommunications-related introductions in 1999
Telecommunications-related introductions in 2013